Farhan Al-Aazmi (born 31 July 1994) is a Saudi Arabian professional footballer who plays as a left back for Pro League side Al-Hazem.

Career
Al-Aazmi started out his career at Al-Bukiryah. He helped Al-Bukiryah earn promotion to the MS League for the first time in their history. He also helped Al-Bukiryah finish 4th in their first season in MS League. On 27 September 2020, Al-Aazmi joined Al-Hazem. On 6 May 2021, he renewed his contract until 2024. In his first season at the club, Al-Aazmi made 34 appearances and scored 4 goals as Al-Hazem were crowned champions of the MS League. On 12 August 2021, Al-Aazmi made his Pro League debut playing the full 90 minutes against Al-Taawoun.

Honours
Al-Bukiryah
Second Division runners-up: 2018–19

Al-Hazem
MS League: 2020–21

References

External links
 
 

Living people
1994 births
Association football fullbacks
Saudi Arabian footballers
Al-Bukayriyah FC players
Al-Hazem F.C. players
Saudi Fourth Division players
Saudi Second Division players
Saudi First Division League players
Saudi Professional League players